Asfar ibn Kurduya (also spelled Kurdawayh, Kardawayh and Kurdawaih), was a Daylamite officer who served the Buyid dynasty.

Asfar is first mentioned during the reign of the Buyid ruler Adud al-Dawla, as one of the most prominent officers of the Empire. After the death of Adud al-Dawla in 983, the Buyid Empire was thrown into civil war; the Empire was disputed between his two sons Samsam al-Dawla and Sharaf al-Dawla. Samsam al-Dawla ruled Iraq, while Sharaf al-Dawla ruled Fars and Kerman.

In 986, Asfar rebelled against Samsam al-Dawla, and changed his allegiance to Sharaf al-Dawla. However, Asfar quickly changed his mind, and declared allegiance to the latter's other brother Abu Nasr Firuz Kharshadh, who was shortly given the laqab of "Baha' al-Dawla." However, Samsam al-Dawla, with the aid of Fuladh ibn Manadhar, suppressed the rebellion, and imprisoned Baha al-Dawla. After this event, Asfar is no longer mentioned.

Sources 

 
 

Daylamites
Buyid generals
Date of death unknown
10th-century Iranian politicians
Year of birth unknown
Rebels against the Buyid dynasty